"Gang" is the seventeenth single by Japanese artist Masaharu Fukuyama. It was released on March 28, 2001.

Track listing
"Gang"
"Sweet Darling"
"Gang" (original karaoke)
"Sweet Darling" (original karaoke)

Oricon sales chart (Japan)

References

2001 singles
Masaharu Fukuyama songs
2001 songs
Songs written by Masaharu Fukuyama